Alyaksandr Mikhnavets (born 24 November 1982) is a Belarusian former professional footballer.

External links

1982 births
Living people
Belarusian footballers
FC SKVICH Minsk players
FC Lida players
FC RUOR Minsk players
FC Minsk players
FC Belshina Bobruisk players
FC Granit Mikashevichi players
FC Slutsk players
FC Krumkachy Minsk players
FC Isloch Minsk Raion players
FC Slonim-2017 players
Association football midfielders